Thomas Taylor (February 4, 1865 – April 26, 1947) was a businessman and political figure in British Columbia. He represented West Kootenay-Revelstoke from 1900 to 1903 and Revelstoke from 1903 to 1916 as a Conservative in the Legislative Assembly of British Columbia.

He was born in London, Ontario, the son of Thomas Taylor and Anne Talbot, and was educated there. Taylor then articled in law in London for two years. In 1885, he moved to Winnipeg and then came to British Columbia in 1888, settling in Revelstoke in 1900. Taylor married Georgie Larson in 1895. He served in the provincial cabinet as Minister of Public Works from 1908 to 1915 and as Minister of Railways from 1911 to 1915. Taylor was defeated by William Henry Sutherland when he ran for reelection in 1916. He died in Vancouver at the age of 82.

Mount Tom Taylor was named in his honour. Taylor had played an important role in the development of Strathcona Provincial Park while serving as Minister of Public Works.

References 

1865 births
1947 deaths
British Columbia Conservative Party MLAs
Businesspeople from London, Ontario
Politicians from London, Ontario